The National Technological University – La Plata Regional Faculty (Castilian: Universidad Tecnológica Nacional - Facultad Regional La Plata (UTN-FRLP)) (The UTN of La Plata, Argentina) is a university in Argentina. The university is housed in an  building. Over 2,000 students have graduated from the University since its creation. The school specializes in technology subjects, offering seven undergraduate and five postgraduate concentrations.

History 
UTN is one of the 24 regional faculties of the National Technological University of Argentina, and was created on 24 September 1954. In the beginning it occupied the Mary O'Graham buildings, and later the building of the Colegio Nacional.

On 1 October 1961, the national government signed the Nº 9035 decree, which designated an official location for the University. This decree stated that the University was to be located on the corner of 60th avenue and 124th street, in the city of La Plata. But it was not until 1966 that the building was inaugurated with help from the government of the Buenos Aires Province.

Courses

Undergraduate
 Engineering:
 Civil Engineering
 Electrical Engineering
 Industrial Engineering
 Mechanical Engineering
 Naval Engineering
 Chemical Engineering
 Information Systems Engineering

Postgraduate
 Magister degrees:
 Environmental engineering
 Food Technology
 Specializations:
 Work Hygiene and Safety
 Laboural Engineering
 Food Technology

References

External links
 Official website
 Faculty Spanish wiki

La Plata
Engineering universities and colleges in Argentina
Technical universities and colleges in Argentina